Louis II of Zweibrücken (14 September 1502 – 3 December 1532) was Count Palatine and Duke of Zweibrücken from 1514 to 1532.

Early life 
He was the son of Alexander, Count Palatine of Zweibrücken (1462–1514) and his wife Countess Margarete of Hohenlohe-Neuenstein (1480–1522).

Marriage and issue 
He was married in 1525 to Elisabeth of Hesse, daughter of William I, Landgrave of Lower Hesse, and they had two children. His son Wolfgang inherited the title and his daughter Christine died young in 1534.

Death 

Louis II died on 3 December 1532 and was buried in the crypt of Alexanderskirche (a church named for his father, who funded the original construction) in Zweibrücken.

Ancestors

References

External links
 Die Genealogie der Wittelsbacher 

Counts Palatine of Zweibrücken
1502 births
1532 deaths
House of Palatinate-Zweibrücken
Burials at the Alexanderkirche, Zweibrücken